Dimitar Trendafilov Vasilev (born 25 February 1967) is a retired Bulgarian footballer and current manager of Spartak Varna II.

With the Bulgarian under-19 team Trendafilov played at the 1987 FIFA World Youth Championship in Chile.

Honours

Club
 Levski Sofia
A PFG:
Winner: 1992-93, 1993-94
Bulgarian Cup:
Winner: 1993-94

References

External links 
 

1967 births
Living people
Sportspeople from Varna, Bulgaria
Bulgarian footballers
Bulgaria youth international footballers
Association football forwards
PFC Spartak Varna players
PFC Beroe Stara Zagora players
PFC Levski Sofia players
PFC Cherno More Varna players
FC Fakel Voronezh players
First Professional Football League (Bulgaria) players
Second Professional Football League (Bulgaria) players
Russian Premier League players
Bulgarian expatriate footballers
Expatriate footballers in Russia
Bulgarian football managers